This article lists numbered roads in Iceland.

History 
As late as 1900 Iceland had only a few miles of roading suitable for wheeled transport, mostly located in the southern regions of the island. A network of bridle paths permitted travel and transport elsewhere. Beginning in 1888 a series of iron bridges were constructed to cross major rivers.

Road types

National roads 
Roads belonging to the national highway system are maintained by the Icelandic Road Administration. They are categorized into the following types:

 Primary Road (S) - all roads belonging to the so-called Grid Icelandic transport.
 Primary highland road
 Secondary road (T) - are the roads that connect institutions and tengivegi, and are generally over 10 km in length.
 Local access (H) - Roads to individual farms and regional connections that do not qualify tengivega (district roads with four-digit numbers are not listed here).
 Highland (L) - ways that can not be considered for any of the above standards, as well as all mountain roads.

Other roads 
F roads are unpaved tracks that may only be driven in vehicles with four-wheel drive. Some include unbridged rivers that must be forded. Trying to drive on an F-road with a normal passenger car means a large risk of being stuck outside of phone coverage and is a breach of Icelandic traffic law, for which one can get a fine.

Road numbering scheme 

The Icelandic road numbering scheme is made up of eight numbering zones which divide the island and mostly follow the division into regions. Each numbering zone has a number which determines what the first digit of the number is.

Division by zones 
The first digits of the numbers are divided as follows (see Regions of Iceland):
 The Ring Road which circles Iceland has the number 1 and it is the only number starting with number 1 (there are no such numbers as 10-19 or 100-199).
 Numbers starting with 2 are in Eastern South Iceland, which is divided by the Þjórsá river.
 Numbers starting with 3 are in Western South Iceland, which is divided by the Þjórsá river.
 Numbers starting with 4 are in Reykjavík and vicinity and on the Reykjanes peninsula.
 Numbers starting with 5 are in West Iceland.
 Numbers starting with 6 are in the Westfjords.
 Numbers starting with 7 are in Western North Iceland, which is divided in the middle of Tröllaskagi peninsula.
 Numbers starting with 8 are in Eastern North Iceland, which is divided in the middle of Tröllaskagi peninsula.
 Numbers starting with 9 are in East Iceland.

Categorization by digits 
There are no numbers other than for the Ring Road (number 1) consisting of only one digit (there are no such numbers as 2-9).
Other numbers can have two or three digits. They are divided as follows:
Numbers with two digits are used on the main roads of the road system (other than the Ring Road).
Numbers with three digits consist of other roads of significant length in the areas.
There are also some numbers with the prefix F with either two or three digits, usually derived from similar non F-numbered roads (they can be an extension of said road). These numbers stand for roads which are generally impassable for vehicles which are not capable of four-wheel driving.

List of roads

Roads with one-digit numbers

Roads with two-digit numbers

Roads with three-digit numbers 
The first number (2 to 9) indicates the region of Iceland where the road is located.

See also 
 Street names in Iceland

References

Iceland
Roads
Roads